The Wan Chai Pak Tai Temple, also known as Yuk Hui Kung, is located on Lung On Street in Wan Chai, Hong Kong. It was built by locals in 1863.
The temple is dedicated to Pak Tai, a martial deity, and houses a  Ming Dynasty statue of Pak Tai built in 1603, as well as a number of antique bells cast in 1863. It is decorated with a large number of lotus lanterns.

The Temple consists of the main building and two annexes. The main building is dedicated to the worship of Pak Tai. Connected to the left of the Yuk Hui Temple is a Hall of Lung Mo and a Hall of God of Wealth and to its right a Hall of Three  Treasures and the keeper's quarters which are probably later additions.

The temple is a declared monument of Hong Kong.

References

External links
 
 Chinese Temples Committee. Yuk Hui Temple (Pak Tai Temple), Wan Chai)
 Antiquities and Monuments Office. Yuk Hui Temple, Wan Chai
 Antiquities and Monuments Office. Heritage Appraisal. Yuk Hui Temple, Wan Chai
 Antiquities Advisory Board. Picture of Temple of God of Wealth at Yuk Hui Temple

1863 establishments in Hong Kong
Buildings and structures completed in 1863
Declared monuments of Hong Kong
Taoist temples in Hong Kong
Wan Chai